Alessandro Sibilia (1591–1637) was a Roman Catholic prelate who served as Bishop of Capri (1637).

Biography
Alessandro Sibilia was born in 1591 in Capua, Italy.
On 20 Apr 1637, he was appointed during the papacy of Pope Urban VIII as Bishop of Capri.
On 1 May 1637, he was consecrated bishop by Giovanni Battista Scanaroli, Titular Bishop of Sidon, with Clemente Confetti, Bishop of Muro Lucano, and Tommaso Carafa, Bishop of Vulturara e Montecorvino, serving as co-consecrators. 
He served as Bishop of Capri until his death in June 1637.

References

External links and additional sources
 (for Chronology of Bishops) 
 (for Chronology of Bishops) 

17th-century Italian Roman Catholic bishops
Bishops appointed by Pope Urban VIII
1591 births
1637 deaths